Bengt Fröbom (12 December 1926 – 8 June 2012) was a Swedish cyclist. He competed in the 4,000 metres team pursuit at the 1952 Summer Olympics.

References

1926 births
2012 deaths
Swedish male cyclists
Olympic cyclists of Sweden
Cyclists at the 1952 Summer Olympics
Sportspeople from Stockholm